Run, Joe, Run was a Saturday-morning television program that aired on NBC from 1974 to 1975. It centered on Joe, a German Shepherd in the military's K-9 corps, and his master, Sergeant Will Corey (played by Arch Whiting).

The show was considered as a cross between Lassie and The Fugitive. Like The Fugitive, and later The Incredible Hulk, it centered on a falsely accused person (in this case, the "person" was a dog) running from authorities and helping people it meets along the way. The show was produced by D'Angelo Productions, which also produced the NBC young adult drama Westwind, and other live-action series for Saturday mornings.

Plot
One day, during training, Joe was falsely accused of attacking his master, a crime for which the dog would be euthanised as punishment. However, the dog escaped before being killed and a $200 bounty was put on its head. Sgt. Corey believed Joe was innocent and joined the pursuit, hoping to find Joe before the authorities did.

During the show's second season, Sgt. Corey, having never found Joe (although he always came close), was called back to duty. Joe then teamed with a hiker, Josh McCoy (played by Chad States), and continued to help others, all the while still on the run.

Cast
Paul Frees provided the voice narration for the program.

 Arch Whiting as SGT William Corey (season 1)
 Chad States as Josh McCoy (season 2)

Episodes

Season 1 (1974–75)

Season 2 (1975)

See also
The Littlest Hobo

References

Citations

Sources

External links

1974 American television series debuts
1975 American television series endings
1970s American children's television series
American children's adventure television series
German shepherds
Individual dogs
NBC original programming
Television series by 20th Century Fox Television
Television shows about dogs